Lantern is the second studio album by Scottish producer and DJ Hudson Mohawke. It was released on Warp on 16 June 2015. It features guest appearances from vocalists including Anohni, Miguel, and Jhené Aiko.

Critical reception
At Metacritic, which assigns a weighted average score out of 100 to reviews from mainstream critics, Lantern received an average score of 70, based on 23 reviews, indicating "generally favourable reviews".

Billboard named it the 6th best dance/electronic album of 2015, while The Skinny named it the 35th best album of 2015.

Track listing

Charts

References

External links
 

2015 albums
Hudson Mohawke albums
Warp (record label) albums
Albums produced by Hudson Mohawke